What You Expect is a collaborative extended play by American rapper Big Sean and American record producer Hit-Boy. It was released through Big Sean's own label, FF to Def, and Def Jam Recordings on October 29, 2021. The EP features guest appearances from Bryson Tiller, Lil Durk, Babyface Ray, and 42 Dugg. Production was mainly handled by Hit-Boy on every track along with side help from G Dav, Oz, Jesse Blum, Rogét Chahayed, Don Cannon, G. Ry, Bryvn, PittThaKid, and Ace G. It was supported by the release of one single, "What a Life", the closing track, which was released exactly a week prior to the release of the EP.

Background and promotion
Big Sean and Hit-Boy have extensively collaborated before the release of the EP. On October 28, 2021, both artists announced the EP, with Sean admitting that he planned to release only one single the same day as the EP was released, but decided to release five songs, which would be part of an EP. The tracklist was revealed hours later. The two artists released the closing track, "What a Life", on October 22, 2021, with a music video.

Track listing

Notes
  signifies an additional producer.
  signifies a co-producer.
 "Into It" features uncredited additional vocals from Nas.
 "The One" contains samples from "You're the One", performed by SWV.

Personnel
Musicians

 Big Sean – vocals (all tracks), songwriting (all tracks)
 Hit-Boy – production (all tracks), songwriting (all tracks)
 G Dav – production (tracks 2, 5), songwriting (tracks 2, 5)
 Jesse Blum – horn (track 1), additional production (tracks 3, 5), songwriting (track 5)
 Oz – production (track 3), songwriting (track 3)
 Coko – songwriting (track 3)
 Tamara Johnson-George – songwriting (track 3)
 Leanne Lyons – songwriting (track 3)
 Andrea Martin – songwriting (track 3)
 Ivan Matias – songwriting (track 3)
 Allen Gordon – songwriting (track 3)
 Bryson Tiller – vocals (track 4), songwriting (track 4)
 Lil Durk – vocals (track 4), songwriting (track 4)
 Rogét Chahayed – additional production (tracks 4–6), songwriting (tracks 4–6), keyboards (tracks 4–6)
 Don Cannon – co-production (track 4), songwriting (track 4)
 G. Ry – co-production (track 4), songwriting (tracks 4, 6), production (track 6)
 Bryvn – co-production (track 4), songwriting (track 4), bass (track 4)
 PittThaKid – co-production (track 4), songwriting (track 4)
 Ace G. – co-production (track 4), songwriting (track 4)
 Babyface Ray – vocals (track 5), songwriting (track 5)
 42 Dugg – vocals (track 5), songwriting (track 5)
 Carter Lang – additional production (track 6), keyboards (track 6)

Technical
 David Kim – mixer (tracks 1–3, 5, 6), recording engineer (tracks 5, 6)
 Colin Leonard – mastering engineer (tracks 1–6)
 Tom Kahre – recording engineer (tracks 1–4, 6)
 Michael Miller – assistant recording engineer (tracks 1, 4)
 Gregg Rominiecki – mixer (track 4)

Charts

References

2021 EPs
Big Sean albums
Collaborative albums
Def Jam Recordings albums
Albums produced by Hit-Boy
Albums produced by Rogét Chahayed